McCurdy is a Scottish and Irish surname.

Notable McCurdys
The following is a list of notable people with the surname McCurdy:

 Alexander McCurdy, American organist and educator
 Allie Hann-McCurdy, Canadian ice dancer
 Arthur Williams McCurdy, Canadian businessman, inventor and astronomer
 Bob McCurdy (1952–2020), American basketball player
 Brendan McCurdy, American television actor 
 Charles McCurdy, British politician
 Charles J. McCurdy, American lawyer, diplomat, and Lieutenant Governor of Connecticut
 Colin McCurdy, Northern Irish Association footballer and manager
 Dave McCurdy, American lawyer and U.S. Representative (D-OK)
 David McCurdy, Canadian merchant and politician
 Earle McCurdy, Canadian labour leader
 Ed McCurdy, folk singer, songwriter and television actor
 Elmer McCurdy (1880–1911), an Oklahoma outlaw
 Fleming Blanchard McCurdy, Canadian politician
 George "Spanky" McCurdy, gospel/soul/pop/hip-hop drummer 
 Harry McCurdy, U.S. baseball player
 Howard McCurdy, Canadian politician and professor
 Howard E. McCurdy, American professor
 Jennette McCurdy (born 1992), American actress
 John McCurdy (architect) (1824–1885), Irish architect
 John McCurdy (baseball) born 1981, professional baseball player
 John McCurdy (tennis) (born 1960), Australian tennis pro from the 1980s
 John Alexander Douglas McCurdy, Canadian aviator and lieutenant-governor of Nova Scotia
 Pat McCurdy. American cabaret singer/songwriter
 Rod McCurdy, Australian cricketer 
 Roy McCurdy, U.S. jazz drummer
 Ryan McCurdy, Northern Irish footballer
 Solomon P. McCurdy (1820–1890), justice of the Supreme Court of the Utah Territory
 William F. McCurdy, Canadian merchant and politician

See also
 MacCurdy
 Macurdy

References

Information taken from the Public Domain Historical Genealogy of the McCurdy Family by D.E. McCurdy
Crownland distribution by King James IV of Scotland as detailed in the Exchequer Rolls of 1450 for the Isle of Bute.

External links
Ancestral McCurdys https://archive.org/details/ancestralmccurdy00blan
MacKirdy Tartan https://tartanregister.gov.uk/tartanDetails?ref=2578

Scottish surnames